FK Tábor was a Czech football club located in Tábor in the South Bohemian Region. The club reached the third round of the 2003–04 Czech Cup before suffering a 5–0 home defeat against Sparta Prague.

Historical names

 1921 — DSK Tábor
 1949 — ČSSZ Tábor
 1954 — Tatran Tábor
 1959 — Vodní stavby Tábor
 1992 — VS Dvořák Tábor
 1993 — FK Tábor s.r.o.
 2012 – merged with FC MAS Táborsko

References

External links
 Official website 

Defunct football clubs in the Czech Republic
Association football clubs established in 1921
Association football clubs disestablished in 2012
Sport in Tábor